Piaggia (Brigasc dialect: A Ciagia; Ligurian: A Ciàzza) is a frazione—comparable to a hamlet—located in the comune (municipality) of Briga Alta, Province of Cuneo in the region of Piedmont, Italy. It is one of three frazioni that form Briga Alta, alongside Carnino and Upega. It is one of a handful of villages where the Brigasc dialect of the Ligurian language is spoken.

References 

Frazioni of the Province of Cuneo